Stanley Harold Fox (born January 7, 1929) was a  Democratic member of the North Carolina General Assembly representing the state's twenty-seventh House district, including constituents in Granville, Vance and Warren counties. A businessman from Oxford, North Carolina, Fox served five terms in the state House. He later served on the Board of Trustees of Vance-Granville Community College. He was born in Oxford, North Carolina.

References

External links

|-

Living people
Members of the North Carolina House of Representatives
1929 births
21st-century American politicians